Lisa Raymond and Rennae Stubbs won in the final 6–4, 6–4 against Mariaan de Swardt and Mary Joe Fernández.

Seeds
Champion seeds are indicated in bold text while text in italics indicates the round in which those seeds were eliminated.

 Lisa Raymond /  Rennae Stubbs (champions)
 Naoko Kijimuta /  Nana Miyagi (first round)
 Kristine Kunce /  Corina Morariu (first round)
 Amanda Coetzer /  Barbara Schett (first round)

Draw

External links
 1998 Boston Cup Doubles Draw

Boston Cup
1998 WTA Tour